Ifeanyi Joenathan Momah [pronounced e-FAH-nee MOE-ma] (born October 23, 1989) is a former American football tight end. He played college football at Boston College.

College career
Momah saw limited action as a true freshman. As a sophomore, he caught 11 passes for 149 yards and three touchdowns. He redshirted his junior season. As a redshirt junior, he caught a career-high 19 passes for 296 yards and three touchdowns. His senior season, he tore his ACL during the first game of the season where he logged a team high eight receptions for 157 yards. He missed the rest of the season. When he tried to appeal for a 6th year, the NCAA denied access, causing him to enter the NFL draft.

Professional career

Philadelphia Eagles
Momah was signed by the Eagles on March 30, 2013 as an undrafted free agent. On August 30, 2013, Momah was waived by the Eagles during final cuts. He was re-signed to a future contract by the Philadelphia Eagles on January 7, 2014.

Cleveland Browns
Momah signed with the Cleveland Browns practice squad on September 9, 2014. He was released on September 16, 2014 to make room for LB Allen Bradford.

Detroit Lions
Momah signed with the Detroit Lions practice squad on October 20, 2014. He was released on November 3, 2014. Momah was re-signed to a reserve/future contract at the conclusion of the season, but was waived with a "failure to disclose physical condition" designation on February 3, 2015.

Arizona Cardinals
After a strong showing at the 2015 NFL Veteran combine, he signed with the Arizona Cardinals in March 2015. Momah, who had previously played as a wide receiver, switched to tight end when joining the Cardinals. On September 10, 2015, Momah was placed on injured reserve after injuring his knee during practice.

On September 3, 2016, Momah was released by the Cardinals and was signed to the Cardinals' practice squad the next day. He was promoted to the active roster on September 27, 2016. On October 24, 2016, Momah caught his first two passes for 50 yards, including one that went for 27 yards in overtime, in a 6-6 tie against the Seattle Seahawks. He was placed on injured reserve on November 2, 2016 after suffering a broken wrist in Week 8.

On September 17, 2017, in Week 2, Momah had a 46-yard reception in the 16–13 overtime victory over the Indianapolis Colts. In Week 10, Momah suffered a broken leg and was placed on injured reserve on November 10, 2017.

Personal life
His parents, Nathan and Gloria, immigrated to the United States from Nigeria as a couple when they were teenagers so they could attend college. 
Ifeanyi’s older brother, Onyi, played fullback at Hofstra University and participated in training camps with the Buffalo Bills and the Cincinnati Bengals.

References

External links
Philadelphia Eagles bio
Boston College Eagles bio

1989 births
Living people
American football wide receivers
People from Greenlawn, New York
Players of American football from New York (state)
American football tight ends
Boston College Eagles football players
Philadelphia Eagles players
Cleveland Browns players
Detroit Lions players
Arizona Cardinals players